The 2009 Cyprus Rally, officially 37th FxPro Cyprus Rally, was the third round of the 2009 World Rally Championship season and was held between March 13 and March 15, 2009 in Limassol, Cyprus. Sébastien Loeb and Daniel Elena claimed the title and won the WRC's first mixed-surface round since 1996.

The Cyprus Rally was last held in 2006, but was dropped along with Rally Australia in favour of new rallies such as Rally Norway, and Rally Ireland, and the returning Rally de Portugal.

Its format changed to a mixed surface rally format from all-gravel rally. The Cyprus Rally was the first rally since Rallye Sanremo - Rallye d'Italia in 1996 to host a mixed surfaced event. Day 1 was contested on tarmac, while days 2 & 3 were contested on rough gravel roads.

Results

Special stages

Championship standings after the event

Drivers' championship

Manufacturers' championship

References

External links 

 Official site

Cyprus
Cyprus Rally
Rally